Halldór Orri Björnsson (born 2 March 1987) is an Icelandic retired footballer who played as a midfielder.

Career
Halldór played club football in Iceland, Germany and Sweden for Stjarnan, SC Pfullendorf, Falkenbergs FF and FH.

He earned two international caps for Iceland between 2012 and 2014.

He retired from football in September 2021.

References

1987 births
Living people
Halldor Orri Bjornsson
Halldor Orri Bjornsson
Halldor Orri Bjornsson
SC Pfullendorf players
Falkenbergs FF players
Fimleikafélag Hafnarfjarðar players
Halldor Orri Bjornsson
Allsvenskan players
Regionalliga players
Association football midfielders
Halldor Orri Bjornsson
Halldor Orri Bjornsson
Expatriate footballers in Germany
Halldor Orri Bjornsson
Expatriate footballers in Sweden